The Colle della Croce (Italian) or  Col Lacroix (French, sometimes referred as Col de la Croix) is a pedestrian pass (el. 2,299 m / 7,541 ft) of the Cottian Alps.

Etymology
Both in Italian and in French the name means pass of the Cross.

Geography 
The pass connects the villages of La Montà (commune of Ristolas, in France) and Villanova (comune of Bobbio Pellice, in Italy).

It forms the limit between the Central and  the Southern Cottian Alps.

Notes

Maps
 Italian official cartography (Istituto Geografico Militare - IGM); on-line version: www.pcn.minambiente.it
 French  official cartography (Institut Géographique National - IGN); on-line version:  www.geoportail.fr
 Istituto Geografico Centrale - Carta dei sentieri e dei rifugi scala 1:50.000 n.6 Monviso

Mountain passes of Piedmont
Mountain passes of the Alps
France–Italy border crossings
Mountain passes of Provence-Alpes-Côte d'Azur